St. Mary Magdalene Church in Wrocław, Poland, is a gothic church located between Szewska and Laciarska street close to the central market square, established in the 13th century. Currently it is a cathedral of the Polish Catholic Church led by Piotr Mikolajczak.On 21 October 1523, the first Lutheran services in Breslau were held here. The church is named after Jesus' companion Mary Magdalene.

Description
During the Second World War the church was seriously damaged. In 1945 the legendary Sinner's Bell, which was the biggest Silesian bell, was also damaged. St Mary Magdalene was rebuilt during the period 1947–1953.

The most precious relic of the church is a Romanesque portal dating from the 12th century, coming from a Benedictine monastery in Ołbin that had been torn down in the 16th century.

The bridge connecting the two towers is called the "Mostek Czarownic" (Witches’ Bridge). A legend says that the shadows visible on the bridge are the souls of the girls who used to seduce men without wanting to be married, being scared of housekeeping. Indeed, shadows represent women with brooms in their hands.

Bibliography
Malgorzata Urlich-Kornacka A guide to Wrocław
Beata Maciejewska Spacerownik Wrocławski

References

External links
St. Mary Magdalene church virtual tour

Churches in Wrocław
Brick Gothic
Wroclaw
Wroclaw
Union of Utrecht of the Old Catholic Churches
Old Catholic church buildings
Gothic architecture in Poland